Minister of Foreign Affairs of Togo is a government minister in charge of the Ministry of Foreign Affairs of Togo, responsible for conducting foreign relations of the country.

The following is a list of foreign ministers of Togo since its founding in 1960:

1960–1963: Paulin Freitas
1963–1967: Georges Apedo-Amah
1967–1976: Joachim Hunlede
1976–1978: Edem Kodjo
1978–1984: Anani Akakpo Ahianyo
1984–1987: Atsu Koffi Amega
1987–1991: Yaovi Adodo
1991–1992: Abdou Touré Tchiaka
1992–1994: Fambaré Ouattara Natchaba
1994–1995: Boumbéra Alassounouma
1995............ Yandja Yentchabre 
1995–1996: Barry Moussa Barqué
1996–1998: Koffi Panou
1998–2000: Joseph Kokou Koffigoh
2000–2002: Koffi Panou
2002–2003: Roland Kpotsra
2003–2005: Kokou Tozoun
2005–2007: Zarifou Ayéva
2007–2008: Léopold Gnininvi
2008–2010: Kofi Esaw
2010–2013: Elliott Ohin
2013–present: Robert Dussey

References

Togo
Foreign Ministers
Politicians